The 2005–06 Copa del Rey was the 104th staging of the Copa del Rey.

Preliminary round 

|}
Bye: Real Unión and Zamora.

First round

Second round

Third round

Fourth round

Round of 16 

|}

Quarter-finals 

|}

First leg

Second leg

Semi-finals 

|}

First leg

Second leg

Final 

 RCD Espanyol: 2005–06 Spanish Cup champion; qualified for 2006–07 UEFA Cup

Top goalscorers

References

External links 
  RSSSF
  Linguasport

Copa del Rey seasons
1